{{Infobox sports rivalry
| name = Chargers–Raiders rivalry
| team1 = Los Angeles Chargers
| team2 = Las Vegas Raiders
| team1logo = Los Angeles Chargers 2020 wordmark.svg 
| team2logo = Las Vegas Raiders wordmark.svg
| first contested = November 27, 1960Chargers 52, Raiders 28
| mostrecent = December 4, 2022Raiders 27, Chargers 20
| nextmeeting = 2023
| total = 127
| largestvictory = Chargers: 44–0 (1961);Raiders: 51–10 (1967)
| currentstreak = Raiders, 1  (2022–present)
| longeststreak = Chargers, 13 (2003–09);Raiders: 10 (1972–77)
| series = Raiders, 68–57–2
| postseason = Raiders, 1–0

| section_header = Championship success
| section_info = AFL Championships (2) 
Chargers (1) – 1963
Raiders (1) – 1967 (VIII)

Super Bowl Championships (3)
Raiders –  (XI),  (XV),  (XVIII)

AFL Western Division Championships (8)Chargers (5) – 1960, 1961, 1963, 1964, 1965Raiders (3) – 1967, 1968, 1969

AFC Wild Card Berths (10) 

Super Bowl Appearances (6)
 Chargers (1) – 
 Raiders (5) – 1967, 
}}
The Chargers–Raiders rivalry is a National Football League (NFL) rivalry between the Los Angeles Chargers and Las Vegas Raiders that has transcended two leagues and a combined five relocations.  Since debuting in the inaugural AFL season, in 1960, as the Oakland Raiders and Los Angeles Chargers in the AFL Western Conference, both teams joined the AFC West in 1970 under the AFL–NFL merger.

Like the 49ers–Rams rivalry in the NFC West, this rivalry represented the geographic and cultural differences between Northern and Southern California, with the Raiders representing Oakland from 1960-81, and again from 1995-2019, and the Chargers repping San Diego from 1961-2016, and Los Angeles in 1960, and since 2017.  The Raiders' 13 seasons in Los Angeles, from 1982-1994, saw the teams only 130 miles apart.  The in-state rivalry was lost with the Raiders' move to Nevada though Las Vegas is closer to Los Angeles by 350 miles than Oakland to San Diego. 

History

1960–1969: AFL days
The Chargers and Raiders were both charter members of the American Football League when the league began playing in 1960. The Chargers moved to San Diego after their first year in Los Angeles, appearing in four of the first five AFL Championship games and winning one. Al Davis, who would later become the famous Raiders owner, started off as an assistant coach for the Chargers until becoming Oakland's head coach in 1963. Under Davis, the Raiders held a competitive edge over the Chargers from the late 1960s to the 1990s, appearing in four Super Bowls and winning three of them.
1970–2014
In 1978, the Raiders won over the Chargers in San Diego with a controversial fumblerooski play now known as the Holy Roller. The loss contributed to the Chargers missing the playoffs that year and sparked an NFL rule change. Two years later, both teams returned to the playoffs and faced off in the 1980 AFC championship game. An offensive shootout between Raiders quarterback Jim Plunkett and Chargers quarterback Dan Fouts saw the Raiders prevail 34–27 en route to winning Super Bowl XV over the Philadelphia Eagles. This is the only playoff meeting between the teams.

The Raiders temporarily left Oakland for Los Angeles in 1982, playing there until the conclusion of the 1994 season. Despite only being there for 13 years, the Raiders developed a strong following in Los Angeles during their tenure in the city, which to this day has impeded the Chargers' ability to develop their own following in Los Angeles since returning to that city.

One of the ugliest games in the rivalry's history occurred in 1998. Chargers rookie quarterback Ryan Leaf completed just 7 of 18 pass attempts for 78 yards and 3 interceptions. The Raiders did not fare much better on offense, but Raiders backup quarterback Wade Wilson passed for a 68-yard touchdown, his only completion of the day. In the end, both teams had benched their starting quarterbacks as the Raiders narrowly won 7–6. The game set an NFL record for the most punts in a game.

Though the Raiders had largely dominated the series for much of the later 20th Century, the Chargers amassed a 13-game winning streak from 2003 to 2009, shortly after the Raiders' appearance in Super Bowl XXXVII and subsequent collapse. One of these losses saw Oakland squander a 15-point halftime lead to lose 28–18, leading up to the firing of head coach Lane Kiffin following that game. The Raiders would finally end the losing streak in 2010, defeating the Chargers 35–27 with two blocked punts, two second-half scoring drives led by quarterback Jason Campbell and a Philip Rivers fumble returned by Tyvon Branch for the Raiders' game-clinching touchdown.

In 2013, the first Raiders-Chargers game was delayed due to an Athletics postseason game the previous evening, kicking off at 8:35 PM Pacific Time, the latest kickoff time in NFL history. The Raiders won 27–17 with a strong performance by quarterback Terrelle Pryor, a fumble return touchdown by Charles Woodson, and five San Diego turnovers. San Diego won the second game that year, however, keeping its playoff hopes alive with a 26–13 win.

2015–2019: Bids to return to Los Angeles
Following the 2015 season, the Raiders and Chargers both proposed to move back to Los Angeles despite their storied rivalry, announcing a shared stadium proposal in Carson, California. However, the proposal was rejected by NFL owners in favor of the St. Louis Rams' proposal to move back to Los Angeles, with the Chargers first being offered a one-year window to accept the chance to share the Rams' stadium and the Raiders to receive the offer should the Chargers decline. On January 12, 2017, Chargers owner Dean Spanos announced his intention to join the Rams in Los Angeles and leave San Diego to play at SoFi Stadium, ultimately leading to Raiders owner Mark Davis accepting a deal to move his team to Las Vegas to play at Allegiant Stadium with the NCAA's UNLV Rebels football program.

2020–present: Post-relocation
Following both teams' relocations by the 2020 season, the Chargers' first home game in the series at the newly built SoFi Stadium featured a notable final play. Down 31–26, Chargers rookie quarterback Justin Herbert threw a pass to Donald Parham that was initially ruled a touchdown but was later overturned after review as Raiders cornerback Isaiah Johnson was seen barely jarring the ball loose from Parham's hands as he fell out of bounds. The call resulted in the Raiders holding on to win. Both teams narrowly missed the playoffs that year, but wound up playing a game during the final week of the 2021 season that would decide the final wild card spots that year. Las Vegas took a commanding 29–14 lead in the fourth quarter, but Herbert led the Chargers back to tie the game at 29 apiece by the end of regulation, forcing overtime. After both teams scored field goals in the extra period, the Raiders were set to run out the clock and accept a tie, but after a Chargers timeout, Las Vegas managed to drive back to field goal range and win the game with a successful kick during the final seconds of overtime, clinching the #5 seed while eliminating the Chargers and allowing the Pittsburgh Steelers to clinch the #7 seed. Had the teams tied, they would have both made the postseason over Pittsburgh via their head-to-head wins over the Steelers earlier in the season.

After the game, Raiders quarterback Derek Carr was asked by NBC sideline reporter Michele Tafoya if the timeout changed their mindset on the final drive, he replied "It definitely did, obviously." In a post game press conference, Raiders interim head coach Rich Bisaccia, when asked if the Raiders were playing to tie, said "We were talking about it. . . . We ran the ball there, and they didn’t call a timeout. So I think they were probably thinking the same thing. And then we had the big run. When we got the big run, it got us in advantageous field goal position. . . . We were certainly talking about it on the sideline. We wanted to see if they were gonna take a timeout or not on that run. They didn’t, so we thought they were thinking the same thing. And then we popped the run in there and gave us a chance to kick the field goal to win it. So, we were certainly talking about it.” Chargers head coach Brandon Staley, when asked about the timeout by the Los Angeles Times said "We felt like they were going to run the ball. So we wanted to ... make that substitution so that we could get a play where we would deepen the field goal." In Justin Herbert's post game press conference he said "I had never been rooting for a tie more in my life. That's the unfortunate part of being so close."

Season-by-season results

|-
| 1960
| style="| | style="| Chargers  52–28| style="| Chargers  41–17| Chargers  2–0
| Inaugural season for both franchises and the AFL.  Chargers lose 1960 AFL Championship.
|-
| 1961
| style="| | style="| Chargers  44–0| style="| Chargers  41–10| Chargers  4–0
| Chargers move to San Diego after playing first season in Los Angeles.  Chargers lose 1961 AFL Championship.
|-
| 1962
| style="| | style="| Chargers  31–21| style="| Chargers  42–33| Chargers  6–0
| 
|-
| 1963
| style="| | style="| Raiders  34–33| style="| Raiders  41–27| Chargers  6–2
| Chargers win 1963 AFL Championship.
|-
| 1964
| Tie 1–1| style="| Chargers  31–17| style="| Raiders  21–20| Chargers  7–3
| Chargers lose 1964 AFL Championship.
|-
| 1965
| style="| | style="| Chargers  24–14| style="| Chargers  17–6| Chargers  9–3
| Chargers lose 1965 AFL Championship.
|-
| 1966
| Tie 1–1| style="| Raiders  41–19| style="| Chargers  29–20| Chargers  10–4
|
|-
| 1967
| style="| | style="| Raiders  41–21| style="| Raiders  51–10| Chargers  10–6
| Chargers open San Diego Stadium.  Raiders win 1967 AFL Championship, lose Super Bowl II.
|-
| 1968
| Tie 1–1| style="| Raiders  34–27| style="| Chargers  23–14| Chargers  11–7
| Raiders lose 1968 AFL Championship.
|-
| 1969
| style="| | style="| Raiders  24–12| style="| Raiders  21–16| Chargers  11–9
| Raiders lose 1969 AFL Championship.
|-

|-
| 
| style="| | Tie  27–27| style="| Raiders  20–17| Chargers  11–10–1
| AFL-NFL merger.  Both teams placed in the AFC West.
|-
| 
| style="| | style="| Raiders  34–0| style="| Raiders  34–33| Raiders  12–11–1
|
|-
| 
| style="| | style="| Raiders  21–19| Tie  17–17| Raiders  13–11–2
|
|-
| 
| style="| | style="| Raiders  27–17| style="| Raiders  31–3| Raiders  15–11–2
| 
|-
| 
| style="| | style="| Raiders  14–10| style="| Raiders  17–10| Raiders  17–11–2
| 
|-
| 
| style="| | style="| Raiders  6–0| style="| Raiders  25–0| Raiders  19–11–2
| 
|-
| 
| style="| | style="| Raiders  27–17| style="| Raiders  24–0| Raiders  21–11–2
| Raiders win Super Bowl XI.
|-
| 
| Tie 1–1| style="| Chargers  12–7| style="| Raiders  24–0| Raiders  22–12–2
| Raiders win 10 straight meetings and go 16–0–2 in 18-game stretch from 1968–77.
|-
| 
| Tie 1–1| style="| Raiders  21–20| style="| Chargers  27–23| Raiders  23–13–2
| Raiders win game in San Diego on controversial Holy Roller play.
|-
| 
| Tie 1–1| style="| Chargers  30–10| style="| Raiders  45–22| Raiders  24–14–2
| 
|-

|-
| 
| Tie 1–1| style="| Chargers  30–24(OT)| style="| Raiders  38–24| Raiders  25–15–2
| Raiders win Super Bowl XV.
|-  style="background:#f2f2f2; font-weight:bold;"
|  1980 Playoffs
| style="| 
| style="| Raiders  34–27
| 
|  Raiders  26–15–2
|  AFC Championship Game.  Only playoff meeting between the two teams.
|-
| 
| style="| | style="| Chargers  23–10| style="| Chargers  55–21| Raiders  26–17–2
| Kellen Winslow has five touchdown receptions in game in Oakland, tied for an NFL record. Chargers' first season sweep over the Raiders since 1965.
|-
| 
| style="| | style="| Raiders  27–17| style="| Raiders  28–24| Raiders  28–17–2
| Raiders move from Oakland to Los Angeles.  Both games played despite a players strike reducing the season to nine games.
|-
| 
| style="| | style="| Raiders  42–10| style="| Raiders  30–14| Raiders  30–17–2
| Raiders win Super Bowl XVIII.
|-
| 
| style="| | style="| Raiders  44–37| style="| Raiders  33–30| Raiders  32–17–2
| Raiders win seven straight meetings.
|-
| 
| Tie 1–1| style="| Chargers  40–34(OT)| style="| Raiders  34–21| Raiders  33–18–2
| 
|-
| 
| style="| | style="| Raiders  37–31(OT)| style="| Raiders  17–13| Raiders  35–18–2
| 
|-
| 
| style="| | style="| Chargers  16–14| style="| Chargers  23–17| Raiders  35–20–2
|
|-
| 
| style="| | style="| Raiders  13–3| style="| Raiders  24–13| Raiders  37–20–2
| 
|-
| 
| Tie 1–1| style="| Chargers  14–12| style="| Raiders  40–14| Raiders  38–21–2
| 
|-

|-
| 
| style="| | style="| Raiders  24–9| style="| Raiders  17–12| Raiders  40–21–2
|
|-
| 
| Tie 1–1| style="| Raiders  9–7| style="| Chargers  21–13| Raiders  41–22–2
| 
|-
| 
| style="| | style="| Chargers  27–3| style="| Chargers  36–14| Raiders  41–24–2
| 
|-
| 
| Tie 1–1| style="| Raiders  12–7| style="| Chargers  30–23| Raiders  42–25–2
| 
|-
| 
| Tie 1–1| style="| Raiders  24–17| style="| Chargers  26–24| Raiders  43–26–2
| Chargers lose Super Bowl XXIX.
|-
| 
| Tie 1–1| style="| Chargers  17–7| style="| Raiders  12–6| Raiders  44–27–2
| Raiders move from Los Angeles back to Oakland.
|-
| 
| Tie 1–1| style="| Raiders  23–14| style="| Chargers  40–34| Raiders  45–28–2
|  
|-
| 
| Tie 1–1| style="| Raiders  38–13| style="| Chargers  25–10| Raiders  46–29–2
| 
|-
| 
| style="| | style="| Raiders  17–10| style="| Raiders  7–6| Raiders  48–29–2
| 
|-
| 
| Tie 1–1| style="| Chargers  23–20| style="| Raiders  28–9| Raiders  49–30–2
| 
|-

|-
| 
| style="| | style="| Raiders  15–13| style="| Raiders  9–6| Raiders  51–30–2
| 
|-
| 
| style="| | style="| Raiders  13–6| style="| Raiders  34–24| Raiders  53–30–2
| 
|-
| 
| Tie 1–1| style="| Raiders  27–7| style="| Chargers  27–21(OT)| Raiders  54–31–2
| Raiders lose Super Bowl XXXVII.
|-
| 
| Tie 1–1| style="| Chargers  21–14| style="| Raiders  34–31(OT)| Raiders  55–32–2
| 
|-
| 
| style="| | style="| Chargers  42–14| style="| Chargers  23–17| Raiders  55–34–2
| 
|-
| 
| style="| | style="| Chargers  34–10| style="| Chargers  27–14| Raiders  55–36–2
|
|-
| 
| style="| | style="| Chargers  21–14| style="| Chargers  27–0| Raiders  55–38–2
|
|-
| 
| style="| | style="| Chargers  28–14| style="| Chargers  30–17| Raiders  55–40–2
| 
|-
| 
| style="| | style="| Chargers  34–7| style="| Chargers  28–18| Raiders  55–42–2
| Raiders wore white jerseys at home for the first time in the team's history against the Chargers on September 28, 2008 in Oakland.
|-
| 
| style="| | style="| Chargers  24–16| style="| Chargers  24–20| Raiders  55–44–2
| Chargers win 13 straight meetings from 2003 to 2009.
|-

|-
| 
| style="| | style="| Raiders  28–13| style="| Raiders  35–27| Raiders  57–44–2
| Raiders sweep division but miss the playoffs, an NFL first.
|-
| 
| Tie 1–1| style="| Raiders  24–17| style="| Chargers  38–26| Raiders  58–45–2
| 
|-
| 
| style="| | style="| Chargers  24–21| style="| Chargers  22–14| Raiders  58–47–2
| 
|-
| 
| Tie 1–1| style="| Chargers  26–13| style="| Raiders  27–17| Raiders  59–48–2
| 
|-
| 
| style="| | style="| Chargers  13–6| style="| Chargers  31–28| Raiders  59–50–2
|
|-
| 
| style="| | style="| Raiders  23–20(OT)| style="| Raiders  37–29| Raiders  61–50–2
| 
|-
| 
| style="| | style="| Raiders  19–16| style="| Raiders  34–31| Raiders  63–50–2
|
|-
| 
| style="| | style="| Chargers  30–10| style="| Chargers  17–16| Raiders  63–52–2
| Chargers relocate from San Diego to Los Angeles.
|-
| 
| style="| | style="| Chargers  26–10| style="| Chargers  20–6| Raiders  63–54–2
| 
|-
| 
| style="| | style="| Raiders  24–17| style="| Raiders  26–24| Raiders  65–54–2
| Final year in the rivalry where the Raiders are a California-based franchise.
|-

|-
| 
| Tie 1–1| style="| Raiders  31–26| style="| Chargers  30–27(OT)| Raiders  66–55–2
| Chargers open SoFi Stadium. Raiders relocate from Oakland to Las Vegas. Both games decided on final play.
|-
| 
| Tie 1–1| style="| Chargers  28–14| style="| Raiders  35–32 (OT)| Raiders  67–56–2
| Raiders clinch playoff berth, eliminate Chargers by beating them in week 18 "win and in" game.
|-
| 
| Tie 1–1| style="| Chargers  24–19| style="| Raiders  27–20| Raiders  68–57–2
|
|- 

|-
| AFL regular season
| style="|Chargers 11–9| Tie 5–5
| Chargers 6–4
|
|-
| NFL regular season
| style="|Raiders 58–46–2| Raiders 28–24–1
| Raiders 30–22–1
| 
|-
| AFL and NFL regular season
| style="|Raiders 67–57–2| Raiders 33–29–1 
| Raiders 34–28–1
| 
|-
| NFL postseason
| style="|Raiders 1–0| Raiders 1–0
| no games
| 1980 AFC Championship Game
|-
| Regular and postseason 
| style="|Raiders 68–57–2'''
| Raiders 34–29–1 
| Raiders 34–28–1
| 
|-

Series leaders 
Statistics limited to Chargers-Raiders regular games. Correct through 2021 season.

See also 
49ers–Rams rivalry
Southern California–Northern California rivalry
Dodgers–Padres rivalry
Kings–Sharks rivalry
Lakers–Clippers rivalry

Notes

References

External links
 Los Angeles Chargers' official website
 U-T San Diego – Chargers/NFL
 Pro Football Hall of Fame – Los Angeles Chargers team history
 Los Angeles Chargers at Sports E-Cyclopedia.org
 Las Vegas Raiders' official website
 San Jose Mercury News – Raiders' coverage
 Las Vegas Raiders at Sports E-Cyclopedia.org
 Pro Football Hall of Fame – Las Vegas Raiders' team history

Los Angeles Chargers
Las Vegas Raiders
National Football League rivalries
1960 establishments in California
Las Vegas Raiders rivalries
Los Angeles Chargers rivalries